Amphekepubis is a dubious genus of mosasaur from the Late Cretaceous of Mexico. Their remains correspond to the holotype specimen UM VP 509, a partial skeleton preserved in three dimensions, comprising the pelvic area, hind limb bones and nine caudal vertebrae, found in the east of Monterrey, in the state of Nuevo Leon, which come from marine sediments (claystones) apparently from the San Felipe Formation, which corresponds to the boundary between the ages of Coniacian and Santonian in the early Late Cretaceous. Amphekepubis is classified within the Mosasaurinae subfamily of mosasaurs.

It has been suggested that the age of the fossils assigned to Amphekepubis may be more recent and that its remains might even belong to the genus Mosasaurus; some recent reviews have simply assigned its type specimen to Mosasaurus.

References

External links
Mosasaur Translation and Pronunciation Guide

Mosasaurids
Mosasaurs of North America
Taxa named by Maurice Mehl
Fossil taxa described in 1930